The Tely 10 Mile Road Race (generally known as the Tely 10) is a 10 mile road race held in the communities of Paradise, Mount Pearl and St. John's, Newfoundland and Labrador, Canada that attracts over 4000 runners annually. The race course often gets mistaken as 10 km. The race began in 1922 making it one of the oldest road races in all of Canada. The race was not run from 1940 to 1945 because of World War II; thus, the 2019 race was the 92nd in the event's history. Due to the COVID-19 pandemic, the in-person 2020 edition was also cancelled, and the 2021 event was held on October 31st.

Course record holders are Paul McCloy (47:04 in 1985) and Anne Johnston (54:25 in 2019).

The race is held every fourth Sunday in July. The sponsor of the race is The Telegram, from which the race draws its name. The race commences on McNamara Road in the Town of Paradise and continues into the city of Mount Pearl then into St. John's where it ends at Bannerman Park in the heart of St. John's. The majority of the course follows Topsail Road (Newfoundland and Labrador Route 60).

The most recent race was held on October 8th, 2022 during Thanksgiving weekend.

Winners

References

External links
 Official website for Tely 10
 Book, The Tely 10 

Sport in St. John's, Newfoundland and Labrador
10-mile runs
Recurring sporting events established in 1922
1922 establishments in Newfoundland